The Westhafen Canal, or Westhafenkanal  in German, is a  canal in Berlin, Germany. It has no locks. 

Construction was begun in 1938, but was interrupted by the Second World War, and only completed between 1954 and 1956. The Westhafen Canal partially replaces the Charlottenburg Canal, which provided an earlier connection between the Berlin-Spandau Ship Canal and the River Spree. The section of the Charlottenburg Canal that paralleled the Westhafen Canal has since been abandoned, whilst the remaining section now provides a second link from the Westhafen Canal to the River Spree and to the Landwehr Canal at Spreekreuz.

References

Canals in Berlin
Buildings and structures in Charlottenburg-Wilmersdorf
Buildings and structures in Mitte
Federal waterways in Germany
Canals opened in 1956